Ian Henderson Black (27 March 1924 – 13 December 2012) was a Scottish professional footballer who made over 260 appearances in the Football League for Fulham as a goalkeeper. He also played for Southampton and was capped by Scotland at international level.

Club career
A goalkeeper, Black's early career with Aberdeen was disrupted by the Second World War, during which he made guest appearances for both Southampton and Chelsea and he won the South Final of the Football League War Cup with the latter. In December 1947 he was transferred to Second Division club Southampton for a £1,000 fee. In three seasons as a contracted player at The Dell, Black made 104 appearances.

In July 1950, Black transferred to First Division club Fulham, in exchange for Hugh Kelly and made 282 appearances for the club. In July 1959, he moved down to the Southern League to play for Bath City, with whom he won the Premier Division championship and the Somerset Premier Cup in 1959–60. After making 143 appearances, Black moved to Canterbury City and retired in 1964. After his retirement from football, Black served as youth team manager (and in 1966, as caretaker manager of the first team) at Brentford, as an advisor to Redhill and secretary at Tolworth.

International career 
Black was capped once by Scotland, in a 2–0 defeat to England on 10 April 1948.

Personal life 
Black served in the Royal Electrical and Mechanical Engineers during the Second World War. After leaving football, Black ran a sports shop in Tolworth with former teammate Eddie Lowe and represented Surrey at bowls.

Statistics

Player

Manager

Honours 
Bath City

 Southern League Premier Division: 1959–60

References

External links 

1924 births
2012 deaths
Footballers from Aberdeen
Scottish footballers
Association football goalkeepers
Aberdeen F.C. players
Bath City F.C. players
Canterbury City F.C. players
Chelsea F.C. wartime guest players
Fulham F.C. players
Southampton F.C. players
Southampton F.C. wartime guest players
Scotland international footballers
English Football League players
Southern Football League players
Scottish Football League players
English Football League managers
Brentford F.C. managers
Royal Electrical and Mechanical Engineers soldiers
British Army personnel of World War II
Scottish football managers
Military personnel from Aberdeen